Tropidophorus sebi, the Baleh water skink, is a species of skink. It is endemic to Sarawak in Malaysian Borneo.

References

sebi
Reptiles of Malaysia
Endemic fauna of Malaysia
Endemic fauna of Borneo
Reptiles described in 2017
Taxa named by Yong Min Pui
Taxa named by Benjamin R. Karin
Taxa named by Aaron M. Bauer
Taxa named by Indraneil Das
Reptiles of Borneo